Chloanthes coccinea is a species of flowering plant in the family Lamiaceae. It is a small, sprawling shrub with scarlet or deep pink flowers.  It is endemic to Western Australia.

Description
Chloanthes coccinea is a small, spreading, much branched shrub with stems in cross section more or less circular. The floral tube almost cylindrical near the base.

Taxonomy and naming
Chloanthes coccinea was first formally described in 1845 by Friedrich Gottlieb Bartling and the description was published in Plantae Preissianae. The specific epithet (coccinea) means "scarlet".

Distribution and habitat
This species grows in sand and gravel on sand plains and lateritic locations north of Albany.

References

coccinea
Flora of Western Australia
Lamiales of Australia
Plants described in 1845